
Gmina Radziemice is a rural gmina (administrative district) in Proszowice County, Lesser Poland Voivodeship, in southern Poland.

Villages
Gmina Radziemice contains the villages and settlements of Błogocice, Dodów, Kaczowice, Kąty, Kowary, Lelowice, Łętkowice, Łętkowice-Kolonia, Obrażejowice, Przemęczanki, Przemęczany, Radziemice, Smoniowice, Wierzbica, Wola Gruszowska, Wrocimowice and Zielenice.

Neighbouring gminas
Gmina Radziemice is bordered by the gminas of Koniusza, Miechów, Pałecznica, Proszowice, Racławice and Słomniki.

References
Polish official population figures 2006

Radziemice
Proszowice County